is a city located in Sorachi Subprefecture, Hokkaido, Japan.

As of September 2016, the city had an estimated population of 14,260 and a density of 16 persons per km2. The total area is 865.02 km2.

History 
Ashibetsu was once a prosperous coal mining city, its population exceeding 70,000 at its peak, but its population has fallen since the closing of the coal mines.

1893 - Satō Denjirō (originally from Yamagata Prefecture) founds Ashibetsu.
1897 - Nae Village (now Sunagawa City) and part of Takikawa Village (now City) split off to form Utashinai Village.
1900 - Ashibetsu Village split off of Utashinai Village.
1906 - Ashibetsu becomes a Second Class Municipality.
1917 - Kuhara Mining Industry Yuya Ashibetu Coal Mine opened.
1923 - First Class Municipality.
1924 - Mitsubishi Mining Industry Ashibetsu Coal Mine opened.
1935 - Meiji Mining Industry Meiji-Kamiashibetsu Coal Mine opened.
1938 - Ashibetsu-Takane Colliery Takane Mining Station opened.
1941 - Ashibetsu Village becomes Ashibetsu Town.
1943 - Mitsui-Ashibetsu Mining Industry Mitsui-Ashibetsu Coal Mine opened.
1953 - Ashibetsu Town becomes Ashibetsu City.
1963 - Meiji Mining Industry Meiji-Kamiashibetsu Coal Mine closed.
1964 - Mitsubishi Mining Industry Ashibetsu Coal Mine closed.
1967 - Ashibetsu-Takane Colliery Takane Mining Station closed.
1969 - Yuya Mining Industry Yuya Ashibetu Coal Mine closed.
1992 - Mitsui-Ashibetsu Mining Industry Mitsui-Ashibetsu Coal Mine closed.
1991 - Canadian World Park opened.
1997 - Canadian World business failure (to become a municipal park).

Geography 
Ashibetsu is in the northern part of Yūbari Mountains. Mount Ashibetsu is south of the city.

Name 
There are two theories about the origin of "Ashibetsu". In both theories the name means Ashibetsu River, which flows through the city.
 "as pet", the river that flows in a shrub
 "hasi pet", the standing river

Locations of interest 
The Hokkaido Kannon is the third-tallest statue in Japan and is the tenth-tallest in the world.

Neighbourhoods 
 Asahimachi (旭町)
 Asahimachi Yuya (旭町油谷)
 Ashibetsu (芦別)
 Fukuzumichō (福住町)
 Higashiraijōchō (東頼城町)
 Honchō (本町)
 Horonai (幌内)
 Izumi (泉)
 Kamiashibetsuchō (上芦別町)
 Kawagishi (川岸)
 Kita 1 Jōhigashi (北1条東)
 1 chōme (1丁目)
 2 chōme (2丁目)
 Kita 2 Jōhigashi (北2条東)
 1 chōme (1丁目)
 2 chōme (2丁目)
 Kita 3 Jōhigashi (北3条東)
 1 chōme (1丁目)
 2 chōme (2丁目)
 Kita 4 Jōhigashi (北4条東)
 Kita 5 Jōhigashi (北5条東)
 1 chōme (1丁目)
 2 chōme (2丁目)
 Kita 6 Jōhigashi (北6条東)
 Kita 1 Jōnishi (北1条西)
 1 chōme (1丁目)
 2 chōme (2丁目)
 Kita 2 Jōnishi (北2条西)
 1 chōme (1丁目)
 2 chōme (2丁目)
 3 chōme (3丁目)
 Kita 3 Jōnishi (北3条西)
 1 chōme (1丁目)
 2 chōme (2丁目)
 3 chōme (3丁目)
 Kita 4 Jōnishi (北4条西)
 1 chōme (1丁目)
 2 chōme (2丁目)
 3 chōme (3丁目)
 4 chōme (4丁目)
 Kita 5 Jōnishi (北5条西)
 1 chōme (1丁目)
 2 chōme (2丁目)
 3 chōme (3丁目)
 4 chōme (4丁目)
 5 chōme (5丁目)
 Kita 6 Jōnishi (北6条西)
 1 chōme (1丁目)
 2 chōme (2丁目)
 3 chōme (3丁目)
 4 chōme (4丁目)
 5 chōme (5丁目)
 Kita 7 Jōnishi (北7条西)
 1 chōme (1丁目)
 2 chōme (2丁目)
 3 chōme (3丁目)
 4 chōme (4丁目)
 5 chōme (5丁目)
 6 chōme (6丁目)
 Koganechō (黄金町)
 Minami 1 Jōhigashi (南1条東)
 1 chōme (1丁目)
 2 chōme (2丁目)
 Minami 2 Jōhigashi (南2条東)
 1 chōme (1丁目)
 2 chōme (2丁目)
 3 chōme (3丁目)
 Minami 3 Jōhigashi (南3条東)
 1 chōme (1丁目)
 2 chōme (2丁目)
 3 chōme (3丁目)
 Minami 1 Jōnishi (南１条西)
 Nakanookachō (中の丘町)
 Nishiashibetsuchō (西芦別町)
 Nokananchō (野花南町)
 Raijōchō (頼城町)
 Rokusenchō (緑泉町)
 Shinjōchō (新城町)
 Takanechō (高根町)
 Takisatochō (滝里町)
 Tokiwa (常磐)
 Tokiwachō (常磐町)
 Toyooka (豊岡)
 Toyookachō (豊岡町)

Climate

Education

University
 Seisa University

College
 Kitanippon Automobile Technical College

High schools

Public
 Hokkaido Ashibetsu High School

Private
 Seisa Kokusai High School

Transportation
 Nemuro Main Line: Ashibetsu - Kami-Ashibetsu - Nokanan
 Route 38

Sister city
 Charlottetown, Prince Edward Island, Canada

References

External links 

 Official Website 

Cities in Hokkaido